Jonathan Rodríguez Menéndez (born 9 July 1991), commonly known as Jony, is a Spanish professional footballer who plays as a left winger for Sporting de Gijón on loan from S.S. Lazio.

Club career

Early years
Born in Cangas del Narcea, Asturias, Jony finished his youth career with FC Barcelona after a period with local Real Oviedo. He made his senior debut with the latter's reserves in the 2010–11 season, in the Tercera División.

In June 2011, Jony moved to Segunda División B club Marino de Luanco. He continued competing at that level the following years, representing Getafe CF B, Real Avilés CF and Sporting de Gijón B.

Sporting Gijón
Jony signed a new two-year deal with the latter's first team on 7 May 2014. He played his first match as a professional three days later, starting and scoring the first goal in a 2–1 home win over Hércules CF in the Segunda División.

In the 2014–15 campaign, Jony contributed seven goals in 41 appearances as the Rojiblancos returned to La Liga after a three-year absence. He made his debut in the competition on 23 August 2015, starting the 0–0 home draw against Real Madrid.

Jony scored his first goal in the Spanish top flight on 23 September, but in a 2–1 loss at Rayo Vallecano.

Málaga
On 23 June 2016, Jony signed a four-year contract with fellow league club Málaga CF after his contract with Sporting expired. On 12 January 2018, he returned to Sporting on loan until the end of the second-tier season. In April, he was named Player of the Month for the previous month.

On 17 June 2018, following Málaga's top-flight relegation, Jony was loaned to Deportivo Alavés of the same division for one year.

Lazio
Jony joined S.S. Lazio on 22 July 2019. His maiden Serie A appearance took place on 1 September, when he came on as a 78th-minute substitute in the 1–1 home draw with A.S. Roma.

On 20 September 2020, Jony moved to CA Osasuna on loan until 30 June 2021 with an option to buy. On 30 January 2022, he returned to Sporting on another loan; the move was extended at the latter in July for another year.

Career statistics

Club

Honours
Lazio
Supercoppa Italiana: 2019

Individual
Segunda División Player of the Month: March 2018

References

External links

1991 births
Living people
People from Narcea
Spanish footballers
Footballers from Asturias
Association football wingers
La Liga players
Segunda División players
Segunda División B players
Tercera División players
Real Oviedo Vetusta players
Real Oviedo players
Marino de Luanco footballers
Getafe CF B players
Real Avilés CF footballers
Sporting de Gijón B players
Sporting de Gijón players
Málaga CF players
Deportivo Alavés players
CA Osasuna players
Serie A players
S.S. Lazio players
Spanish expatriate footballers
Expatriate footballers in Italy
Spanish expatriate sportspeople in Italy